Four Falls is a settlement in New Brunswick, Canada.

History

Notable people

See also
List of communities in New Brunswick

References

Communities in Victoria County, New Brunswick